Grotesk may refer to:
Akzidenz Grotesk, a typeface
Grotesk (comics), a Marvel Comics character
Grotesque (typeface classification), a typeface classification
Grotesk, a DC Comics story-arc by John Ostrander and Tom Mandrake appeared in Batman (vol. 1) #659-662
Grotesk, a character introduced in this story-arc

See also
Grotesque